Virgílio Manuel Bagulho Lopes (born 27 October 1957), known simply as Virgílio, is a Portuguese former footballer who played as a right back. He played club football for Sporting CP, Famalicão and Braga and made three appearances for his country.

References

1957 births
Living people
People from Loures
Portuguese footballers
Association football defenders
Primeira Liga players
Liga Portugal 2 players
Sporting CP footballers
F.C. Famalicão players
S.C. Braga players
Portugal youth international footballers
Portugal under-21 international footballers
Portugal international footballers
Sportspeople from Lisbon District